Joshua Huntington (31 January 1786 in Norwich, Connecticut – 11 September 1819 in Groton, Massachusetts) was a United States clergyman.

Biography

He was a son of Jedidiah Huntington, a general in the Continental Army during the American Revolutionary War. He graduated from Yale in 1804. He was licensed to preach by the New London Association in September 1806 and ordained pastor of the Old South Church (then at the Old South Meeting House), Boston, on 18 May 1808, which charge he held until his death.

He was one of the founders of the American Educational Society in 1815, and was president of the Boston Society for the Religious and Moral Instruction of the Poor, which was founded in 1816. He was the author of Life of Abigail Waters (1817).

His wife, Susan Mansfield Huntington (born 27 January 1791; died 1823), wrote a story entitled “Little Lucy.” Her memoirs, with her letters, journal, and poetry, were published by Benjamin B. Wisner (Boston, 1829; republished in Scotland).

Notes

References

1786 births
1819 deaths
American clergy
Yale University alumni
Clergy from Boston